Product of Hate is an American thrash metal/groove metal band from Kenosha, Wisconsin. The band is currently signed to Napalm Records, and they have released two studio albums to date.

History 
The band was formally found under the name I for an I in 2007, however the band decided to change their name due to a Canadian band with the same name. To avoid potential legal issues, they decided on Product of Hate.

On February 5, 2016, Product of Hate released their debut album, Buried in Violence, under Napalm Records. The album was recorded by both Scott Creekmore at Mercenary Digital Studios in Zion, Illinois and Chris Djuricic, sometimes known as Chris Wisco, at Belle City Sound in Racine, Wisconsin and mixed and mastered by James Murphy, former guitarist of Death, Testament, and Obituary. The album debuted at number 9 on the Billboard Heatseekers East North Central Chart.

The band's second album, You Brought This War, was released on February 5, 2021.

Concert tours 
Prior to signing with Napalm Records, Product of Hate played numerous one-off dates with bands such as Hatebreed, Chimaira and Lamb of God. After signing to Napalm, the band embarked on their first North American Tour (The "GetRekt" Tour) with Allegaeon and The Agonist in 2015. Product of Hate's first tour following the release of "Buried in Violence" was a late spring run with Mushroomhead, Sumo Cyco and Madame Mayhem from April–June 2016. From September–October 2016, the band teamed with their Napalm Records labelmates, Hammer Fight for a tour of the Eastern United States dubbed the Hammer Out the Hate Tour.

In 2017, Product of Hate toured the U.S. with Skinlab and IKILLYA.

Band members

Current 
Adam Gilley – vocals
Mike McGuire – drums
Mark Campbell – bass guitar
Gene Rathbone – lead guitar
Cody Rathbone – rhythm guitar

Timeline

Discography

Studio albums 
Buried in Violence (2016)
You Brought This War (2021)

EPs 
The Unholy Manipulator (2010)

Singles 
"Revolution of Destruction" (2012)
"A Well-Deserved Death" (2012)
"...As Your Kingdom Falls" (2015)
"Monster" (2016)
"Rapture" (2018)
"Shout at the Devil" (Mötley Crüe cover) (2019)
"Euphoria" (2020)
"Cult of Personality" (Living Colour cover) (2020)

Music videos

References 

American groove metal musical groups
American thrash metal musical groups
Heavy metal musical groups from Wisconsin
Musicians from Kenosha, Wisconsin